Bobilla is a genus of cricket in tribe Nemobiini, found in Australasia and the Pacific islands.

Taxonomy
The Orthoptera Species File database lists the following species groups and species:
Bobilla bivittata (Walker, 1869) - type species (as Nemobius bivittatus Walker, F)
Bobilla bakali Otte & Alexander, 1983
Bobilla bivittata (Walker, 1869)
Bobilla kindyerra Otte & Alexander, 1983
Bobilla neobivittata Otte & Alexander, 1983
Bobilla poene Otte & Alexander, 1983
Bobilla tasmani Otte & Alexander, 1983
Bobilla victoriae Otte & Alexander, 1983
Bobilla plurampe Otte & Alexander, 1983
Bobilla killara Otte & Alexander, 1983
Bobilla plurampe Otte & Alexander, 1983
Bobilla avita Otte, 1987
Bobilla bigelowi (Swan, 1972)
Bobilla gullane Su & Rentz, 2000
Bobilla illawarra Su & Rentz, 2000
Bobilla nigrovus (Swan, 1972)

References

Ground crickets